Britnell is a surname. Notable people with the surname include:

 Adrian Britnell, Australian set designer and artist
 Frederick Britnell (1899–1980), British World War I flying ace
 Mark Britnell (born 1966), British civil servant and businessman
 Richard Britnell (1944–2013), British historian
 Roma Britnell (born 1967), Australian politician